Bekan or Becan is a village in County Mayo, Ireland. Because of the almost entirely rural population, it is traditionally a farming community. The village is off the R323 road between Knock and Ballyhaunis. The local school is St. Joseph's National School.

The Connacht Gaelic Athletic Association Centre of Excellence was built outside the village in December 2012.

Sport
Eastern Gaels is the local Gaelic Football club, which represents both Bekan and Brickeens. The Connacht GAA Centre of Excellence is the major sporting facility in the area. The centre is just outside the village. The centre has a 3G pitch, five floodlit Gaelic games pitches, and a gymnasium.

Transport
Bekan railway station opened on 1 January 1909 and closed on 17 June 1963.

Further reading
 Béacán/Bekan: Portrait of an East Mayo Parish, edited by Fr. Michael Comer and Dr. Nollaig Ó Muraíle, published in 1986.

See also
 List of towns and villages in Ireland

References

Towns and villages in County Mayo
Civil parishes of County Mayo